Marianne Illing (born December 2, 1974 in Ottawa, Ontario) is a Canadian water polo player.

Illing is a graduate of Carleton University. She was a member of the Canadian women's Olympic water polo team in Athens, 2004. She was part of the 4th place women's water polo team at the 2003 World Championships in Barcelona, Spain.

References
 

1974 births
Living people
Canadian female water polo players
Water polo players at the 2004 Summer Olympics
Olympic water polo players of Canada
Carleton University alumni
Sportspeople from Ottawa
Pan American Games silver medalists for Canada
Pan American Games medalists in water polo
Water polo players at the 2003 Pan American Games
Medalists at the 2003 Pan American Games